The men's middleweight 75 kg boxing event at the 2019 European Games in Minsk was held from 21 to 30 June at the Uruchie Sports Palace.

Results

Final

Round of 64

Top half

Bottom half

References

External links
Draw Sheet

Men 75